Halifax: Retribution is a continuation sequel to the original Halifax f.p. series (1994–2002) which premiered on 25 August 2020 on the Nine Network in Australia. Rebecca Gibney returns as Doctor Jane Halifax who, after years as a university professor, is brought back into the forensic psychiatrist field to help the police task force find a new serial killer. The series is again set in Melbourne.

Production
In November 2018, Nine announced it would be reviving the series, set to air in 2020 titled Halifax: Retribution, with Roger Simpson returning as writer and producer, alongside executive producer Mikael Borglund and writers Mac Gudgeon and Jan Sardi; it would be produced by Beyond Lonehand, a joint venture between Simpson and Beyond Productions.

In July 2019, it was announced that Anthony LaPaglia and Jessica Marais would be joining the series, along with Jacqueline McKenzie, Rick Donald, Hannah Monson, Craig Hall, Mavournee Hazel and Louisa Mignone. 

In September 2019, Marais dropped out of the series due to her work schedule and personal commitments. Claudia Karvan was a late addition to the cast list; she was known to the directors and had worked onscreen with Gibney in the telemovie, Small Claims (2004), and its two sequels. The first promo for the series premiered in April 2020 along with announcement of more cast members.

Cast
Rebecca Gibney as Jane Halifax
Anthony LaPaglia as Tom Saracen
Claudia Karvan as Mandy Petras
Craig Hall as Ben Sailor
Mavournee Hazel as Zoe Sailor
Ben O'Toole as Daniel/Jarrod
Ming-Zhu Hii as Mila Bronski 
Rick Donald as Nick Tanner
Michala Banas as Erin 
Jacqueline McKenzie as Sharon Sinclair 
Mark Coles Smith as Kip Lee 
John Waters as Ryan
Mandy McElhinney as Minister Nolan

Episodes

Ratings

References

External links
 

Nine Network original programming
2020 Australian television series debuts
2020 Australian television series endings
Television shows set in Victoria (Australia)
2020s Australian crime television series
Television series by Beyond Television Productions